Dampong is a town in the Asante Akim South, a district in the Ashanti Region of Ghana.

Education 
There is a Secondary school at Dampong called Jubilee Mission Senior High School which was opened in September 2007 by Ashanti Akim Community Organisation AACO.

References

Populated places in the Ashanti Region